Robert Joseph Saucier (born March 10, 1955) is an American politician. He is a former member of the Maine House of Representatives for Presque Isle, ME, House District 147 of the 127th Maine Legislature. During his first two terms in office, Saucier served on both the Agriculture, Conservation and Forestry Committee and the Veterans and Legal Affairs Committee.

Political career
A Democrat, Saucier was first elected to represent House District 5 in November 2012, defeating Republican incumbent Michael Willette by a margin of 3% (1,933 to 1,821 votes).  He was re-elected to his second term in November, 2014 to the renamed House District 147. Saucier currently serves as the Assistant Sergeant-at-arms in the Maine State Senate.

Personal
Saucier is a veteran of the USAF, retired Captain (United States O-3) of the Army National Guard (ARNG), and retired civil service member of the United States Government. Has had a mustache for the last 40 years.

Saucier is a graduate of the Northern Maine Vocational Technical Institute (now Northern Maine Community College) and the University of Southern Maine.  Saucier currently resides in Presque Isle, ME with his wife, Anna Marie.

References

1955 births
Living people
People from Presque Isle, Maine
Democratic Party members of the Maine House of Representatives
University of Southern Maine alumni
21st-century American politicians
Northern Maine Community College alumni